Village Dittal Abro is a village in Sindh.

It is 15.7 km away from Larkana. It is in taluka Kamber Shahdadkot District. There are many castes residing in this village, such as Abro   two well-known tribes: Tajani Abro  and Agham Abro ; Syed (Urdu: سيد ) Syed Bokhari , Soomro , Meerani , Lashari , Haslo , Malano , Chandio  and Mangi .

See also
Sufi Waryal Faqeer Abro

References

Villages in Pakistan